Palauk is a town in the Myeik District,  Taninthayi Region, in Myanmar. It is located on the main coastal road, Route 8, between Tavoy and Palaw. Palauk is the administrative seat of the Palauk Subtownship.

Administrative subdivisions
The administrative divisions of the Palauk Subtownship are the following:
Kyauklonegyi 
Pyichar 
Sinhtoegyi 
Nanthilar 
Pyinbugyi

Notes

External links
 "Palauk Map — Satellite Images of Lanywa" Maplandia World Gazetteer

Populated places in Tanintharyi Region